The 2021–22 Bentley Falcons men's ice hockey season was the 45th season of play for the program, the 23rd at the Division I level, and the 19th season in the Atlantic Hockey conference. The Falcons represented Bentley University and were coached by Ryan Soderquist, in his 20th season.

Season
Bentley began its season in very good standing, defeating both Ohio State and Boston College in the first few weeks of the season. The Falcons cooled off a bit afterwards but still managed to win a few games as they tried to start out their goaltending situation. They began the year with Nicholas Grabko in goal but he never seemed to be able to put a string of good performances together. Unfortunately, the two other options (Evan Debrouwer and Jason Grande) didn't play any better.

In mid-November, Debrouwer got his second shot as the starter and made the most of his opportunity, winning five games in a row to put Bentley near the top of the Atlantic Hockey standings by the mid point of the season.

After the winter break, Bentley had to reschedule several games around an uptick in COVID-19 positive tests that were affecting all of college hockey but seemed to get out of the trouble by the end of January. That was only the beginning of their trouble, however, as goaltending issues sent the Falcons careening towards the bottom of the conference. Debrouwer was never able to regain the form he had shown in November and December and allowed fewer than 3 goals in just two of his next nine games. Neither Grabko nor Grande could provide better support for the team in goal and Bentley ended up stumbling towards the finish. Even when their goaltenders were able to limit teams to just a few goals, the Falcons' offense went missing and Bentley finished the regular season with and 11-game winless streak.

They opened the postseason on the road against Niagara and completely reversed course, winning two matches to both end their streak and move onto the conference quarterfinals. The team's low position, however, sent them into a match with top-seeded American International and the Falcons were routed in back-to-back games.

Departures

Recruiting

Roster
As of August 23, 2021.

|}

Standings

Schedule and results

|-
!colspan=12 style=";" | Regular Season

|-
!colspan=12 style=";" | 

|- align="center" bgcolor="#e0e0e0"
|colspan=12|Bentley Won Series 2–0

|- align="center" bgcolor="#e0e0e0"
|colspan=12|Bentley Lost Series 0–2

Scoring statistics

Goaltending statistics

Rankings

Note: USCHO did not release a poll in week 24.

Awards and honors

References

2021–22
2021–22 Atlantic Hockey men's ice hockey season
2021–22 NCAA Division I men's ice hockey by team
2021 in sports in Massachusetts
2022 in sports in Massachusetts